Ligonipes is a spider genus of the jumping spider family, Salticidae. Five of the six described species are found in the Australian region, the exception being Ligonipes similis, recorded as being from Sumatra. Their body form mimics ants.

L. semitectus is a very common spider in Queensland, Australia. Males are 4 mm long, females 5 mm. There has been no information about L. similis (formerly in genus Rhombonotus) since its original description in 1882.

Species
, the World Spider Catalog accepted the following species:
 Ligonipes flavipes Rainbow, 1920 – Norfolk Island
 Ligonipes illustris Karsch, 1878 – Queensland
 Ligonipes lacertosus (Thorell, 1881) – Queensland
 Ligonipes semitectus (Simon, 1900) – Queensland
 Ligonipes similis (Hasselt, 1882) – Sumatra
 Ligonipes synageloides (Szombathy, 1915) – New Guinea

References

Further reading
 Richardson, B.J.; Zabka, M.; Gray, M.R. & Milledge, G. (2006). "Distributional patterns of jumping spiders (Araneae: Salticidae) in Australia". Journal of Biogeography 33(4): 707-719.

External links
 Find-a-Spider: Ligonipes semitectus

Salticidae
Salticidae genera
Spiders of Australia
Spiders of Asia